Jan Marek Szymański (born 2 March 1989) is a Polish speed skater. He is the current holder of the Polish records in 3000 and 5000 metres.

Speed skating
In speed skating at the 2013 Winter Universiade, Szymański, who is a student at the University School of Physical Education in Poznań, won the gold medal in both the 1500 and 5000 meters.

Jan won the bronze medal at the 2018 European Speed Skating Championships in Kolomna in the Team pursuit event together with his fellow team mates Zbigniew Bródka and Adrian Wielgat.

Olympic Games
At the 2013 World Single Distance Championships in Sochi, Russia, Szymański won the bronze medal in the men's team pursuit together with Zbigniew Bródka and Konrad Niedźwiedzki. The same result was reached at the 2014 Winter Olympics at the same venue.

Personal records

Personal life
Szymański's fiancée Luiza Złotkowska is also a speed skater.

References

External links 
 

1989 births
Polish male speed skaters
Speed skaters at the 2014 Winter Olympics
Speed skaters at the 2018 Winter Olympics
Olympic speed skaters of Poland
Medalists at the 2014 Winter Olympics
Olympic medalists in speed skating
Olympic bronze medalists for Poland
Universiade medalists in speed skating
Sportspeople from Poznań
Living people
World Single Distances Speed Skating Championships medalists
Universiade gold medalists for Poland
Competitors at the 2013 Winter Universiade